Holvar-e Sofla (also Romanized as Holvar-e Soflá and Holver-e Soflá; also known as Halbaré Sofla, Ḩalvar-e Pā’īn, Holvar, and Ḩolvar-e Pā’īn) is a village in Seyyed Jamal ol Din Rural District, in the Central District of Asadabad County, Hamadan Province, Iran. At the 2006 census, its population was 373, in 93 families.

References 

Populated places in Asadabad County